Augurin is a protein that in humans is encoded by the C2orf40 gene.

References

Further reading